The 1967 British flying saucer hoax was originally thought to be the unidentified landing of six 'spaceships' that occurred across Southern England on Monday, 4 September 1967.

The six craft were located along the 51st line of latitude from the Thames Estuary to the Bristol Channel, roughly equidistant from each another; one each at a new housing estate near Queenborough on the Isle of Sheppey, Bromley golf course in south London, a horse paddock in Winkfield village (near Ascot), the village of Welford (near Newbury), in Berkshire, Chippenham in Wiltshire and on Dial Hill in Clevedon in Somerset.

The hoax was undertaken by aircraft engineering apprentices from the Royal Aircraft Establishment (RAE) at Farnborough.

Planning and building the 'spacecraft'

The idea behind the hoax was planned in January 1967 as part of Farnborough college's upcoming Rag Week. The apprentices created their flying saucers in fibreglass halves and then covered them in metal with no aerials or portholes visible. Inside each saucer was placed electronic equipment that would make an eerie sound when the saucer was flipped over. Each saucer was also filled with a mixture of flour and water.

Groups of two or three then drove to the selected locations in the dead of night and carried the saucers into fields. Here they flipped the saucers over causing them to emit the electronic sound. They then left the field and headed back to Farnborough. None of the teams was detected.

Response from the authorities
When each of the saucers was later reported to the police each was cordoned off. The British army's southern command, several police forces, army bomb disposal units, RAF helicopters were all mobilised. The Ministry of Defence was informed and the army blew up the saucer found at Chippenham. The one on the Isle of Sheppey was removed by helicopter. Another was sent to the Atomic Weapons Establishment at Aldermaston and one to the guided weapons division of the British Aircraft Corporation. When one of the saucers was drilled into, the mixture inside exploded, covering police officers in foul-smelling slime.

Revealing the hoax
The pranksters responsible were Christopher Southall and Roger Palmer, both aged just 21. The idea behind the hoax was to raise funds during the college's Rag Week. The hoax garnered extensive media attention - both in Britain and abroad. The apprentices did not think the hoax would create such a media storm but several were later interviewed on television. They revealed the hoax the same day as the saucers were found. No action was taken against the hoaxers and they raised £2,000 for charity.

References

External links
 Pictures of the hoax flying saucers

1967 in England
1967 hoaxes
September 1967 events in the United Kingdom
UFO hoaxes
Hoaxes in the United Kingdom